Club Atlético Peñarol Basketball, commonly known as simply Peñarol, is the senior men's basketball section of the Uruguayan sports club Peñarol, based in Montevideo. The team played in the Uruguayan Primera División, which was organized by the Uruguayan Basketball Federation, until the club was expelled in 1997.

After returning to official competitions in 2018, Peñarol currently plays in the LUB, the top division of Uruguayan basketball. Recently, Peñarol has also played in the Basketball Champions League Americas, the highest continental level. Over the club's history, they have won six Uruguayan Championships, as well as the South American Championship of Champions Clubs in 1983.

History
Peñarol's basketball section dates back to the late 1920s. When Club Piratas was formed; in 1931, it became Peñarol. The club's first league game, which was in the fourth division of Uruguayan basketball, was played in 1940. By 1943, the team was playing in the Uruguayan top-tier level Federal Championship. The following year, Peñarol won the Federal Championship, a tournament including the best basketball teams in Montevideo. In 2003, the league changed its name to the LUB.

In 1945, Peñarol left the Uruguayan Basketball Federation, to play in a new league; the club rejoined the federation in 1947, when the upstart league failed. In 1952, Peñarol again won the Uruguayan Federal Championship. After a down period for the team (with relegation in 1968), Peñarol won the Uruguayan Federal Championship in 1973, 1978, 1979, and 1982. In 1983, the club also won the South American Championship of Champions Clubs, and thus qualified to play at the 1983 edition of the FIBA Intercontinental Cup. In 1985, the club was relegated, beginning a downward spiral, which ended with its expulsion from the Uruguayan Federal Championship in 1997.

Peñarol rejoined the Uruguayan Basketball Federation in 2018, competing in Uruguay's third-tier league, the DTA. In 2019, Peñarol won the Metropolitano championship, promoting to the top division, Liga Uruguaya (LUB), after beating Club Cordón in the finals.

Arenas
Peñarol's home games are played at the 4,700 seat "Palacio Peñarol".

Honours and titles

Continental
 South American Championship of Champions Clubs 
 Champions (1): 1983
 Runners-up (1): 1974

National
 Uruguayan Championship 
 Champions (6): 1944, 1952, 1973, 1978, 1979, 1982
Liga Uruguaya de Básquetbol
Runners-up (1): 2022
 First Division Winter Tournament 
 Champions (5): 1953, 1955, 1978, 1981, 1982

Players

Current roster
As of 2 February 2023.

References

External links
 Official website

Basketball teams in Uruguay
Basketball teams in Montevideo
Peñarol